Mammillaria albicoma is a species of plant in the family Cactaceae. It is endemic to Mexico.  Its natural habitat is hot deserts. It is threatened by habitat loss.

References

albicoma
Cacti of Mexico
Endemic flora of Mexico
Endangered plants
Endangered biota of Mexico
Taxonomy articles created by Polbot